Gutta Mixx is the fifth album from rapper Bushwick Bill. It is his last solo studio album to contain explicit lyrics.

Track listing
Drwahbushwickching
Keepemsingn
Vonwolfgangdonchucknice
20minutesormore
Farenheit9one1
Willbushwick
Milleniumpimpwick
Recklessendangerment
Damn If I Let It Be
Feelmyheart
Dowhatyoudo
Phantomchuckopera
Gorealaentertainment
Milleniumpimpnscrewed
20minutesormore (Soul Mix)

References

2005 albums
Bushwick Bill albums